Meilin Reservoir is a reservoir located in Futian District, in southwestern Shenzhen, Guangdong Province, in the southern China. Meilin Reservoir belongs to the first grade water source protection area and is part of Shenzhen's water supply network. It is surrounded by the Longding Hill.

History
The reservoir was formed in June 1956 with the name of Maxie Reservoir. In 1991 the Shenzhen Water Conservancy expanded the reservoir.

Climate
It enjoys a mild climate and has plenty of rainfall and sunshine. Every year from April to September is the flood season, rainfall accounted for 84.3% of the whole year.

Public Access
The reservoir is open to public all day. It is a popular recreation area for fishing and tourism.

Transportation
 Take bus No. 821 to Meilin Park Bus Stop.
 Take Shenzhen Metro Line 9 to get off at Xiameilin station, getting out from Exit C and walk to Xiameilin Market Bus Stop to transfer to bus No. 111 to Meilin First Village Bus Stop.
 Take Shenzhen Metro Line 4 to get off at Shangmeilin station, getting out from Exit C and walk to Zhongkang Park Bus Stop to transfer to bus No. 334 to Shangmeilin Market Bus Stop.

Gallery

References

Reservoirs in Shenzhen
Futian District
Tourist attractions in Shenzhen
1956 establishments in China